Laurin Braun (born 18 February 1991) is a German professional ice hockey forward who is currently playing for Grizzlys Wolfsburg of the Deutsche Eishockey Liga (DEL). His older brother Constantin Braun plays for the Eisbären Berlin.

Playing career
He began playing professionally with Eisbären Berlin in the 2008–09 season. He played with Berlins junior team in the third-level Oberliga for four seasons. Following the 2016–17 season, Braun opted to leave the only organization he had played with, in signing a one-year deal with fellow German club, ERC Ingolstadt, on June 21, 2017.

Braun contributed with 18 points in his first season in Ingolstadt before returning for a second year with the club in the 2018–19 season. Limited through injury, Braun collected just 6 points in 37 games, before opting to leave the club at the conclusion of the post-season.

On April 10, 2019, Braun agreed to a one-year contract with his third DEL club, Krefeld Pinguine.

In his third season with Krefeld Pinguine in 2021–22, Braun as team captain posted 6 goals and 18 points through 42 regular season games. He was unable to prevent Kreleld from suffering relegation to the DEL2 for the first time in their history.

As a free agent, Braun opted to remain in the DEL, joining Grizzlys Wolfsburg on a two-year contract on 12 May 2022.

References

External links

1991 births
Living people
Eisbären Berlin players
ETC Crimmitschau players
ERC Ingolstadt players
Krefeld Pinguine players
German ice hockey left wingers
Grizzlys Wolfsburg players
People from Lampertheim
Sportspeople from Darmstadt (region)